Dalida is a 2005 French-Italian two-part television film directed by Joyce Buñuel. The film is about the life of French-Italian singer and actress Dalida.

Plot 
The series deals with French-Italian singer Dalida, from her birth to Italian parents in Cairo, Egypt, to her long and successful singing career in Europe, Asia, America and Africa, until her tragic death in Paris, France.

Cast 
 Sabrina Ferilli as Iolanda Gigliotti, also known as Dalida
 Charles Berling as Lucien Morisse
 Michel Jonasz as Bruno Coquatrix
 Christopher Lambert as Richard Chanfray
 Arnaud Giovaninetti as Bruno / Orlando
 Alessandro Gassman as Luigi Tenco
  as Rosy
  as 
 Carole Richert as Solange
 Stephan Spassov as Claudio
  as Eddie Barclay
 Marie-Noëlle Bordeaux as Peppina
 Guillaume Adam as The receptionist
 Roberto Bestazzoni as Mario, an Italian producer
 Jeff Bigot as journalist at the wedding
 Bruno Delahaye as The casting director
  as Andréa
 Silvana Gasparini as Dalida's sister-in-law
  as Matouk
  as Orlando the Elder
  as The maid in Ankara
  as Paulo de Sena
  as The taxi driver
 Nikolai Urumov as Pietro Gilliotti
  as Pascal Sevran
 Pascal Lopez as The bar man

References

External links 
 

French biographical films
French drama films
French television films
2005 television films
2005 films
Biographical films about singers
Dalida
Films shot in Bulgaria
Cultural depictions of Dalida
2000s French films